Máximo David Alonso Fontes (born 5 July 2002) is a Uruguayan professional footballer who plays as a forward for Peñarol.

Club career
A youth academy graduate of Peñarol, Alonso made his professional debut on 28 January 2021 in his club's 1–2 league defeat against Defensor Sporting.

International career
Alonso is a current Uruguayan youth international. He was part of Uruguay's squad at 2017 South American U-15 Championship.

Career statistics

Honours
Peñarol
 Uruguayan Primera División: 2021
 Supercopa Uruguaya: 2022

Peñarol U20
U-20 Copa Libertadores: 2022

References

External links
 

2002 births
Living people
Association football forwards
Uruguayan footballers
Uruguay youth international footballers
Uruguayan Primera División players
Peñarol players
People from Maldonado, Uruguay